Sucre is a department in the Caribbean Region of Colombia. The department ranks 27th by area,  and it has a population of 904,863, ranking 20th of all the 32 departments of Colombia. Sucre is bordered by the Caribbean on the northwest; by Bolívar Department on the east and by Córdoba Department on the west.

Sucre was named in honor of the Independence hero Antonio José de Sucre who was quoted by the founders of this department in reference to Simón Bolívar's death as saying "They have killed my heart", expression said while cruising the territory of the present day Sucre Department.

As of 2009, the Sucre Department has an estimated population of 802,733, of which 234,886 are in the department capital Sincelejo, according to the DANE projections.

History

Pre-Columbian
Before the Spanish Conquest, the land comprising the department of Sucre was mainly inhabited by two groups of indigenous people — the Zenú and the Turbacos. The Zenú language was perhaps part of the Chibchan language family by the Arhuacos branch. The Turbaco people were part of the Cariban language family and they controlled the area adjacent to the Gulf of Morrosquillo. The Zenú people — by the Finzenú and Panzenú branches — controlled the rest of the territory, which used to be part of a bigger territory along the current department of Córdoba and parts of Bolívar and Antioquia sometimes known as Zenú kingdom or Zenú nation.

The area adjacent to the coast was inhabited by the Turbaco people and it was the border lands of the Carib's territories in the Cariibean Coast of Colombia. This specific part of the Carib's included the coasts of the present day departments of Magdalena, Atlántico and Bolívar.

The Zenú engineers were able to develop a complicated hydraulic infrastructure in the basin of the San Jorge river — they also worked in the basin of the Sinú river in lands of the Córdoba Department — involving flood control works as well as drainage and irrigation systems.

Colonization

The first Spanish conquerors that sighted to the coastline of the present day Sucre Department were Alonso de Ojeda, Juan de la Cosa, Rodrigo de Bastidas and Francisco Cesar around 1499.

The conquerors thought the territory to be rich in precious metals since, but soon they would find out they were wrong about that. This situation led to the encomenderos to employ the indigenous workforce almost exclusively for cattle rising on the northern areas.

The territory had been under the tutelage of the government settled in Cartagena – except a brief period of time when it was under the jurisdiction of the central government in Bogotá – this control was effective by several denominations while the country evolved from its colonial institutions until its final republican form in 1886 and until the establishment of Sucre as a department independent from Bolivar.

Modern history

In 1963, the Second Assembly of Municipalities created the Department of Sucre. People vouched for its creation after a campaign led by CorpoSucre. On July 28, 1966, the Senate of Colombia started a debate on the creation of the department and on August 18 of the same year approved its creation under the 47 Law of 1966 sanctioned by the then-president of Colombia, Carlos Lleras Restrepo.

Geography

Administrative Divisions

Provinces
Sucre is subdivided into 5 regions or provinces:

Mojana Province

Guaranda
Majagual
Sucre

Montes de María Province

Chalán
Coloso
Morroa
Ovejas
Sincelejo

Morrosquillo

Coveñas
Palmito
San Onofre
Tolú
Tolúviejo

Sabanas

Buenavista
Corozal
El Robel
Galeras
Los Palmitos
Sampúes
San Juan de Betulia
San Pedro
Sincé

San Jorge

Caimito
La Unión
San Benito Abad
San Marcos

Municipalities

 Buenavista
 Caimito
 Chalán
 Colosó
 Corozal
 Coveñas
 El Roble
 Galeras
 Guaranda
 La Unión
 Los Palmitos
 Majagual
 Morroa
 Ovejas
 Palmito
 Sampués
 San Benito Abad
 San Juan Betulia
 San Marcos
 San Onofre
 San Pedro
 Sincé
 Sincelejo
 Sucre
 Tolú
 Toluviejo

Oceanic areas

The Archipelago of San Bernardo is within the Sucre Department.

References

External links

 Government of Sucre official website

 
Caribbean region of Colombia
Departments of Colombia
States and territories established in 1966